The 1958 DFB-Pokal Final decided the winner of the 1957–58 DFB-Pokal, the 15th season of Germany's knockout football cup competition. It was played on 16 November 1958 at the Auestadion in Kassel. VfB Stuttgart won the match 4–3 after extra time against Fortuna Düsseldorf, to claim their 2nd cup title.

Route to the final
The DFB-Pokal began with 5 teams in a single-elimination knockout cup competition. There were a total of two rounds leading up to the final. In the qualification round, all but two teams were given a bye. Teams were drawn against each other, and the winner after 90 minutes would advance. If still tied, 30 minutes of extra time was played. If the score was still level, a replay would take place at the original away team's stadium. If still level after 90 minutes, 30 minutes of extra time was played. If the score was still level, a drawing of lots would decide who would advance to the next round.

Note: In all results below, the score of the finalist is given first (H: home; A: away).

Match

Details

References

External links
 Match report at kicker.de 
 Match report at WorldFootball.net
 Match report at Fussballdaten.de 

Fortuna Düsseldorf matches
VfB Stuttgart matches
1957–58 in German football cups
1958
Sport in Kassel
20th century in Kassel
November 1958 sports events in Europe